Giacomo De Santis (born 15 March 1995, Rome) is an Italian rugby union player.
His usual position is as a Centre and he currently plays for Colorno in Top10. 

In 2014 and 2015 De Santis was named in the Italy Under 20 squad and in 2017 he was also named in the Emerging Italy squad for the annual World Rugby Nations Cup.

References

External links 
It's Rugby England Profile
Eurosport Profile

1995 births
Living people
Sportspeople from Rome
Italian rugby union players
Rugby union wings
Rugby Colorno players